Aérospatiale C.22 is a subsonic target drone developed and manufactured by Aérospatiale since 1980, and used in testing the MBDA Aster missile. It is powered by a Microturbo TRI 60-02.

To ensure the tests of the Centre d'Essais de Landes in 1995, 74 targets including twenty C22, eleven Nord Aviation CT20 and twenty-seven Fox, were launched. It was last used in France in 2014. It is equipped with a towed target for the training of anti-aircraft gun crews and ground-to-air missile batteries.

Specifications

References

External links

Target drones of France
C.22